Olhopil is a village in Haisyn Raion of Vinnytsia Oblast, Ukraine.

First known since 1780 as Rohuzka Chechelnytska it was a border town between Rzeczpospolita and Budjak Horde. In 1795 it was renamed Olgopol by Ekaterina II in the name of her granddaughter, Olga Pavlovna. It was also known as Holopol. In Imperial Russia it used to be a small town, the center of Olgopol uyezd of Podolia Governorate.

Before the 1917 Revolution, Olgopol (also, spelled Olhopil) was a district town in the province of Podolia. The Jewish population in 1847 was 247; by 1897 the number had increased to 2,473.

Olgopol suffered heavily in 1919 at the hands of the Ukrainian bands which were active in the surroundings. Jews were also attacked by the armies of Anton Ivanovich Denikin). In 1926 the Jewish population numbered 1,660 (76.4% of the total). At the time of the German-Rumanian occupation (July 1941), most of the Jews fled from the townlet, which was incorporated into the zone annexed by the Rumanians (Transnistria). The Jews who remained were concentrated into a ghetto together with about 600 Jews who had been expelled from Bessarabia and Bukovina, all of them being submitted to forced labor in the vicinity.

Further reading

References

Olgopolsky Uyezd
Shtetls
Holocaust locations in Ukraine

Villages in Haisyn Raion